Marusheva is a rural locality (a village) in Cherdynsky District, Perm Krai, Russia. The population was 23 as of 2010.

Geography 
Marusheva is located 51 km northeast of Cherdyn (the district's administrative centre) by road. Rozhnevo is the nearest rural locality.

References 

Rural localities in Cherdynsky District